Jesse Harris (born October 24, 1969) is an American singer-songwriter, producer, and guitarist. He has worked with Norah Jones, Melody Gardot, Madeleine Peyroux, Nikki Yanofsky, and Lizz Wright.

Early life and education
Harris and his twin sister were born in New York City. He attended Riverdale Country School in New York City. He graduated from Cornell University in 1991 with a Bachelor of Arts degree in English.

Career
Jesse Harris's music has been described as a "blend [of] folk, rock, jazz, and world rhythms."

Harris gave guitar lessons and performed in musical groups before he formed the duo Once Blue with singer-songwriter Rebecca Martin. This was the first group he was in and his first experience writing for another singer. Once Blue released its self-titled debut on EMI Records in 1995 and nine additional songs were included in the album's re-release in 2003.

Harris signed as a songwriter with Sony Publishing in 1998 and then made three self-released recordings with his new band, The Ferdinandos, consisting of Harris, Tony Scherr, Tim Luntzel, and Kenny Wollesen. The band released two more albums on Verve Records. Harris recorded three solo albums Mineral, Feel, and Watching the Sky on his own label, Secret Sun Recordings.

In 2003, he was awarded a Grammy Award for Song of the Year for "Don't Know Why", performed by Norah Jones. Jones's album, Come Away With Me, includes five of Harris' compositions: "Don't Know Why," "Shoot the Moon," "One Flight Down," "I've Got To See You Again," and "The Long Day is Over." Harris plays guitar throughout the whole album. Jones and Harris have collaborated numerous times since then. Jones has been a guest on many of his albums and he appears as guitarist on almost all of her albums. Harris contributed songwriting to Jones' 2008 release The Fall.

Harris appears as a guitarist on Bright Eyes' 2005 album, "I'm Wide Awake It's Morning," as well as "Motion Sickness."

In 2007, Harris contributed songs to the soundtrack of the film The Hottest State, written and directed by Ethan Hawke. The soundtrack featured new versions of his songs by Jones, Willie Nelson, Emmylou Harris, Feist, Cat Power, M. Ward, The Black Keys, Bright Eyes, Brad Mehldau and Rosario Ortega. He also acted in the film.

In August 2010 Harris released his album Through the Night and recorded a new version of his song "The Secret Sun" for a Corona (beer) commercial.

Harris's 11th album, Sub Rosa, recorded in Rio de Janeiro, was released in July 2012 and features guest vocals from Conor Oberst, Melody Gardot, and Norah Jones. Harris's 12th album, the stripped down Borne Away, was released on June 25, 2013.

In 2013, Harris joined John Zorn's, The Song Project, along with Mike Patton, Sofia Rei, and Sean Lennon, writing lyrics for various Zorn compositions and singing them at festivals worldwide with a band featuring Marc Ribot on guitar, John Medeski on keyboards, and Zorn conducting. Two of the group's albums have been released by Tzadik Records.

Harris and Jones appear together in the 2014 David Wain/Michael Showalter film, They Came Together, performing his song, "It Was The Last Thing On Your Mind," which Harris produced. In 2016 he appeared in Showalter's film "Hello, My Name Is Doris," performing his song, "Anything Was Possible."

Recently, Zorn and Harris have begun a new project, Songs For Petra, which features Petra Haden and The Julian Lage Trio (for whom Harris has produced two albums, Arclight and Modern Lore), plus Harris on guitar.

Other artists who have recorded Jesse's songs include Smokey Robinson, George Benson, Pat Metheny, Kandace Springs, and Solomon Burke. Songwriting collaborations have included Madeleine Peyroux, Melody Gardot, Lana Del Rey, Maria Gadu, Maya Hawke, and Vinicius Cantuaria.

Production credits include albums for Forro in the Dark, Sasha Dobson, and Petra Haden. Haden recorded an album of Harris' songs entitled "Seemed Like A Good Idea – Petra Haden Sings Jesse Harris" (Sunnyside).

In 2017, Jesse started Cosmo, a group for only his instrumental compositions, with CJ Camerieri (trumpet/flugelhorn/french horn), Will Graefe (guitar), Jeremy Gustin (drums), Benjamin Lazar Davis (bass), Michael Boshcen (trombone), and Harris (guitar). They are currently working on an album with producer Jason Lader.

Harris's album Aquarelle was recorded in Lisbon, Portugal, and released in September 2018, and features Gustin and Graefe, Ricardo Dias Gomes (bass, keyboards), Petra Haden, Valerie June, Sophia Brous, Thomas Bartlett, Rob Moose, Jesse Carmichael, Marcelo Camelo, and Jason Lader. On Surpresa, in 2021, introduced by the song 'Waiting' Harris closely collaborated again with Vinicius Cantuária.

Discography

As leader/co-leader 
 Once Blue with Rebecca Martin (EMI, 1995)
 Jesse Harris and the Ferdinandos (Bean, 1999)
 Crooked Lines (Bean, 2001)
 Without You (Bean, 2002)
 The Secret Sun (Verve, 2003)
 While the Music Lasts (Verve, 2004)
 Mineral (Secret Sun, 2005)
 Feel (Velour, 2007)
 Watching the Sky (Mercer Street, 2009)
 Through the Night (Mercer Street/Secret Sun, 2010)
 Cosmo (Tzadik, 2010)
 Sub Rosa (Dangerbird, 2012)
 Borne Away (Secret Sun, 2013)
 No Wrong No Right (Dangerbird, 2015)
 Music for Chameleons (Sunnyside, 2017)
 Aquarelle (Secret Sun, 2018)
 Once Blue Live at the Handlebar with Rebecca Martin (Core Port, 2018) – live recorded in 1996
 Songs Never Sung (Secret Sun, 2019)
 Everlasting Day (Secret Sun, 2020)

As sideman
 Bright Eyes, I'm Wide Awake, It's Morning (Saddle Creek, 2005)
 Bright Eyes, Motion Sickness (Team Love, 2005)
 Chiara Civello, Al Posto Del Mondo (Sony Music, 2012)
 Chico Pinheiro, There's a Storm Inside (Sunnyside, 2010)
 Federico Aubele, Berlin 13 (ESL Music, 2011)
 Forro in the Dark, Light a Candle (Natgeo, 2009)
 Forro in the Dark, Forro in the Dark Plays Zorn (Tzadik, 2015)
 Jessie Baylin, You (Hickory, 2007)
 Jessie Baylin, Firesight (Verve, 2008)
 Johnathan Rice, Trouble Is Real (Warner, 2005)
 Joshua Radin, The Rock and the Tide (Mom and Pop, 2010)
 Julian Lage, Arclight (Mack Avenue, 2016)
 Julian Lage, Modern Love (Mack Avenue, 2018)
 Kandace Springs, Soul Eyes (Blue Note, 2016)
 Kandace Springs, Indigo (Blue Note, 2018)
 Ken Hirai, Ken's Bar (Defstar Japan, 2003)
 Lana Del Rey, Lust for Life (Polydor/Interscope, 2017)
 Lisa Loeb, Tails (Geffen, 1995)
 Lizz Wright, Dreaming Wide Awake (Verve, 2005)
 Lizz Wright, Freedom & Surrender (Concord, 2015)
 Madeleine Peyroux, Careless Love (Rounder, 2004)
 Marisa Monte, O Que Voce Quer Sabe De Verdade (EMI, 2011)
 Melody Gardot, The Absence (Universal, 2012)
 Melody Gardot, Currency of Man (Universal, 2015)
 Melody Gardot, Live in Europe (Universal, 2018)
 Melody Gardot, My One and Only Thrill (Universal, 2009)
 Norah Jones, First Sessions (Blue Note, 2001)
 Norah Jones, Come Away with Me (Blue Note, 2002)
 Norah Jones, Feels Like Home (Blue Note, 2004)
 Norah Jones, Not Too Late (Blue Note, 2007)
 Norah Jones, The Fall (Blue Note, 2009)
 Richard Julian, Slow New York (Manhattan, 2006)
 Ricky Fante, Rewind (Virgin, 2003)
 Sasha Dobson, Modern Romance (Secret Sun, 2006)
 Seamus Blake, Stranger Things Have Happened (Fresh Sound, 1999)
 Tiago Iorc, Zeski (Som Livre, 2013)
 Tomoyo Harada, Love Song Covers (Universal, 2015)
 Tristan Prettyman, Twenty-three (Virgin, 2006)
 Vinicius Cantuaria, Indio De Apartamento (Naive, 2012)
 Wax Poetic, On a Ride (Nublu, 2012)

Film/theater/television
 Dragon Tales – TV show – opening theme song (1998); guitarist, songwriter
 Arrivals – stage play – Bank Street Theatre (2007); incidental music composer 
 The Hottest State – film – Think Films (2007); guitarist, songwriter, score composer, actor
 Verano Maldito – film – Luis Ortega Film (Argentina, 2011); songwriter, singer, actor
 They Came Together – film – Lionsgate Films (2014); guitarist, songwriter, producer, actor
 Hello, My Name Is Doris – film – Roadside Attractions (2016); guitarist, songwriter, actor

References

External links
 
 NPR story on The Hottest State

1969 births
Living people
American folk guitarists
American male guitarists
American singer-songwriters
American male singer-songwriters
Cornell University alumni
Grammy Award winners
Dangerbird Records artists
Downtown Records artists
Tzadik Records artists